The  is the legislature of Osaka Prefecture. As in all prefectures, it is elected to four-year terms by single non-transferable vote in multi- and single-member districts and is responsible for enacting and amending prefectural by-laws, approving the budget and important administrative appointments in the prefectural government, including the prefecture's vice governors. The assembly has a regular membership 88 members.

Current composition 

The 2019 assembly election took place on 7 April 2019 as part of the 19th unified local elections. The Osaka Restoration Association, retained its position as the largest party in the assembly, reclaimed an outright majority, as it had after the April 2011 election.

As of 30 April 2019, the assembly was composed as follows:

Electoral districts 
Changes to the electoral districts at the April 2015 election, there are 88 assembly members who are elected in 53 electoral districts, reduced from the 109 members who were elected at the 2011 election. Most districts cover one municipality or one ward of a designated major city (Osaka and Sakai), but some cover several wards or municipalities. The nine towns and one village within the prefecture are referred to by the district that they belong to.

References

External links
 Osaka Prefectural Assembly 
 Osaka Prefectural Government: Secretariat of the prefectural electoral commission 

Politics of Osaka Prefecture
Prefectural assemblies of Japan